Lynn de Silva's theology began at an early stage in Lynn de Silva's ministry, when his interest in Buddhism and its culture began to increase. He believed that the credibility of Christianity depended on its ability to relate to Buddhism, which was the faith of the majority of the Sri Lankan population. His objective was to develop a richer appreciation of the similarities between Buddhism and Christianity, in particular, to communicate the Christian message in a manner that the Sri Lankan culture understood, and to construct a theology that is focused towards the Buddhist cultural environment. To this end, he used Buddhist concepts to communicate Christian beliefs in a language understood from the Buddhist context, and he aimed at extending Christian theology with Buddhist concepts in order to gain a more thorough understanding of Christianity. In his book The Problem of the Self in Buddhism and Christianity, de Silva states the following:

To obtain the necessary background in Sri Lankan Buddhist practices, de Silva consulted reputed Buddhist monks and scholars, visited Buddhist places of worship, and consulted written sources on Sri Lankan Buddhism. Although most of his studies were completed in English, he took a special effort to master Sinhalese and the Sri Lankan culture. Furthermore, he became proficient in Pali, the language of the Buddhist scriptures. His findings eventually led to his most popular work, the book titled Buddhism: Beliefs and Practices in Sri Lanka . In the early 1980s, this book was considered unparalleled as an introduction to Buddhism in Sri Lanka, and also considered the most complete, thorough and sensitive book on Buddhism in Sri Lanka, resulting in it generally being recommended by professors and monks as a standard book on Buddhist practices in Sri Lanka.

Tilakkhana 

Lynn de Silva believed that the construction of a theology that is focused towards the Buddhist cultural environment "must begin with living existential realities and not with metaphysical speculations," and that such a theology should attempt at understanding man's existence from concrete experiences common to mankind. In Tilakkhana, or the three characteristics – anicca, dukkha and anattā – of all existence discovered by the Buddha in his diagnosis of the human predicament, de Silva finds the appropriate starting point for such a theology.

Although Tilakkhana is a Buddhist concept, de Silva finds that Tilakkhana is not a concept alien to the Bible. In his search for Tilakkhana in the Bible, de Silva finds anicca and dukkha in a number of Biblical passages, such as Psalms 90, that speak of the transitoriness, suffering, and anxiety of human life. This leads him to believe that "the polarity of conflict between being and the possibility of non-being that lies at the core of human existence, the mood of anxiety, the finitude and precariousness of man's life, is a familiar theme that runs through the Bible." Furthermore, de Silva finds that, although there is no systematic exposition of Tilakkhana in the Bible as found in Buddhist texts, the undertones of anicca, dukkha and anattā do occur together in the Bible.

Anattā-Pneuma 

In 1979, de Silva released his most outstanding contribution to Theology, the book titled The Problem of the Self in Buddhism and Christianity , which has since been cited extensively (e.g.,) and attracted reviews from international journals (e.g.,). In this book, de Silva compares the biblical notion of "the soul" (pneuma) or "the self," with the Buddhist doctrine of "no soul" (anattā) or "no self." Contrary to popular belief, de Silva shows that modern Christian scholarship does not support the notion of a soul as an immortal entity separate from the body. He argues that such a misconception arose as a consequence of the translation of the Bible into Greek:

Based on his observation, de Silva shows how the Buddhist doctrine of anattā is complementary to the Christian notion of personal identity – pneuma. He distinguishes that, while pneuma focuses on man as a relational entity, anattā focuses on man as an isolated entity. Furthermore, de Silva infers that if we do consider anattā to be real in Buddhism or Christianity, pneuma must also be real for Nibbāna or the Kingdom of God to be a positive ideal. In conclusion, de Silva proposes the compound notion anattā-pneuma as a solution for the problem of the self in Buddhism and Christianity; this new notion, he states, conforms with the anattā Buddhist-Christian belief in the non-existence of an immortal soul inhabiting the body, but also lays more emphasis on social relationships by means of pneuma.

In his review of de Silva's book The Problem of the Self in Buddhism and Christianity, Joseph Kitagawa argues that de Silva is too narrow in his analysis of the anatta doctrine; he claims that a better analysis would have been for de Silva to take into consideration the broader implication of the anattā doctrine, and to challenge the very basis of Greek philosophy which had influenced much of Christian theology. Furthermore, Kitagawa argues that de Silva could have entertained the possibility that Theravada Buddhism might look for Ultimate Reality more readily in the Mahayana Buddhist tradition, rather than turning towards Christianity. In Donald Mitchell's analysis of the same book by de Silva, he states that a better framework for dialogue with Hindu traditions could be allowed if de Silva considered an expanded hermeneutical circle that includes a more positive notion of soul that is compatible with the biblical understanding of man. By doing so, Mitchell argues, de Silva would be able to "include inherently valuable insights from the Christian tradition on the nature of man."

From the evangelical theologians, Tissa Weerasinghe believed that de Silva needs to put more emphasis on the "glaring disharmony" between Christianity and Buddhism that their differing views on the biblical notion of soul suggest. In relation to de Silva's treatment of this notion, Dyrness states that insights into the biblical picture of human life apart from God cannot be found by a dialogue with Buddhism, but by Christian Asians carefully considering the Scriptures and their own Asian setting. A similar perspective is taken by Lim et al., who insist that de Silva should communicate the Christian message to the Buddhists, instead of giving Buddhist meanings to Christian concepts and harmonising in a syncretistic way the concepts belonging to the two religions. In a publication that aims at an evangelical approach to religions and cultures, Yung interprets de Silva's contribution as not so much an able exercise in dialogue, but, rather, a brilliant Christian apologetic, addressed to Theravada Buddhists.

Salvation 

With his inclusivistic view on religion in the early stages of his career, Lynn de Silva believed that salvation does not only apply to Christians, but also to other religions. He maintains that while Christians can use Christ as their means for salvation, other religions can use their own means for salvation:

Later in his life, de Silva developed more of a pluralistic view on religion, believing that neither of the two religions is superior to the other. This change of view is evident in his posthumously published article Buddhism and Christianity Relativised, in volume 9 of the Dialogue journal.

In Tilakkhana, de Silva finds a foundation for a constructive dialogue with Buddhists regarding the role of Jesus as saviour in Christianity. Buddhists overcome Tilakkhana by turning attention away from the self and focusing their attention towards anattā; therefore, the ultimate goal to which Buddhism is directed towards – Nibbana – can be achieved by self effort. This, de Silva believes, is one of the "deepest dilemmas in Buddhism," leading him to ask the question "What is the self that denies the self and at the same time asserts that it alone can save the self?" He infers that "to deny the self and to affirm self-sufficiency is a contradiction."

He argues that it is the Bible that takes the anattā characteristic of Tilakkhana seriously. With Jesus as saviour, de Silva believes a perfect solution for man's tragic condition in Tilakkhana can be found in Christianity; in particular, he shows that the role of Jesus as saviour supports his conviction that a person cannot save himself through self effort. He goes on to say that by emphasising the anattā characteristic, Christians could make an attempt to convince Buddhists of the necessity of divine help in attaining Nibbana.

Despite doctrinaire Buddhists' claims, de Silva shows that the need for a saviour has found expression in Buddhism in numerous ways. By examining his own culture, de Silva goes on to show that the majority of lay Buddhists in Sri Lanka view the Buddha as a living saviour, who is able to confer blessings to mankind.

In her Ph.D. thesis containing a chapter on de Silva's work, Damayanthi Niles claims that there is a problem with de Silva's argument in relation to salvation, in that it "reconciles the exclusive Christ-event and the inclusive vision of God's salvific plan purely on Christian terms," and that it does not take the "religious visions and commitments of other faiths seriously." Furthermore, she argues that de Silva's understanding of salvation, as found in his paper Non-Christian Religions and God's Plan of Salvation , borrows a religious idea from other religions and uses the idea to make Christianity more palatable to other religions and to Christians sensitive to pluralism.

Anattā and God 

Lynn de Silva shares John Hick's view that although different religions use different concepts such as God and Buddha, all these concepts refer to the same Ultimate Reality. Regarding this commonality between religions, de Silva writes:

He acknowledges that the Buddhist way for obtaining peace and insight without the need for belief in God constitutes a "novel and powerful challenge to Christianity." However, he maintains that the concept of God could still become a fruitful area for dialogue with Buddhism. For such dialogue to take place, he argues that a reorientation of Christian thought about God is necessary, in order to eliminate some of their base notions of God and to help them come to a more thorough understanding of what they mean by "God."

In relation to the place of "God" in Buddhism, de Silva contributed to the development of the Dharma-God idea, in which what the Buddha rejected is interpreted as being the notions that were considered during the Buddha's generation to be associated with God, rather than the Ultimate Reality that the term "God" or "Brahman" signified. Regarding the concept of Dharma (or Dhamma) in Buddhism, de Silva states that if there is nothing beyond the Dhamma, then the Dhamma must be the supreme Being in whom the highest ideals are acknowledged and actualised.

His main contribution toward overcoming the incompatibility between Buddhism and Christianity in regards to the concept of God is in arguing that an understanding of the Biblical treatment of anattā can find a place for "God" in Buddhism. In particular, he argues that Christianity carries the concept of anattā into its logical conclusion, and that "it is in relation to the reality of God that the reality of anattā can be meaningful".

Thanatology 

In the last few years before his death, de Silva focused his study towards the study of human death, namely, the field of Thanatology. His quest was motivated mainly by the death of his wife Lakshmi in December 1980, but also by his curiosity about the meaning of resurrection. With this frame of mind, de Silva studied the beliefs and practices of people with respect to death, such as the phenomenon of mediums, with help from Buddhist exponents of reincarnation. Although traces of his findings were found in his last writings, de Silva died before completing his study, in May 1982. His last findings were published posthumously by his friend and colleague, Fr. Aloysius Pieris S.J., in the paper Buddhism and Christianity Relativised, which appeared in volume 9 of the Dialogue journal.

In this paper, de Silva talks about "Life Beyond Death," and writes that theologians should not ignore data about the Parapsychology. He urges that evidence about the paranormal is compelling, and that it is a field that merits careful study.
Regarding Purgatory, de Silva states in this paper that the Hindu/Buddhist view, where Ultimate Reality is reached through a process of purification through liberation from self and elevation to stages of spiritual development, is more acceptable than the belief in a single life on earth and an everlasting hell or heaven after death. Furthermore, he insists that the Hindu/Buddhist view conforms to modern theological as well as psychical research. In agreement with the Hindu/Buddhist view, de Silva regards Purgatory to be a place of cleansing, which ultimately makes a person ready for eternal life in Heaven:

In his final Dialogue journal publication Reflections on Life in the Midst of Death, de Silva explains that it is sin which has created the illusion of self in man, and that it is this illusion that drives man towards self-possession and selfishness. He states that belief in self alienates man from Ultimate Reality as well as from one another, giving rise to dukkha or feelings of despair, emptiness and meaninglessness, when man is in the midst of death. He stresses on the importance of love in overcoming this clinging to self, and maintains that love is non-selfish by nature, and that love involves responsibility and venturing beyond one's own interests:

Tissa de Alwis, in his Th.D. thesis studying the works of Lynn de Silva, argues that "de Silva's attempt to harmonise Rebirth, Purgatory, and an intermediate state, which is a kind of a continuum in which one passes from a near state of annihilation to the closest union with God, is inconsistent with the radical picture of Biblical anatta"; furthermore, de Alwis states that de Silva "fails to define lostness in the final sense and slides into an unrestricted universalism."

Publications

Books

Book chapters

Papers 

 
 
 
 
 . [Reprinted in Cyclostyled form by Study Center, Sri Lanka, 1964]
 . [Reprinted in Cyclostyled form by Study Center, Sri Lanka, 1964]

Newspaper and magazine articles

Dialogue journal 
Following is a list of editorials and article edits in the Dialogue journal by Lynn de Silva.

De Silva as subject

References 

Christian theology by tradition